Stéphen Vincent (born 2 September 1986) is a former French footballer who last played for Le Mans in Ligue 2.

He previously played in Ligue 2 for FC Gueugnon, and had a lengthy career in the lower divisions.

He retired at the end of the 2019–20 season.

References

External links
 
 Stéphen Vincent at foot-national.com
 

1986 births
Living people
People from Neuilly-sur-Marne
Footballers from Seine-Saint-Denis
French footballers
Association football midfielders
Association football forwards
AS Saint-Étienne players
US Raon-l'Étape players
FC Gueugnon players
AS Cannes players
FC Rouen players
Paris FC players
FC Martigues players
US Boulogne players
Le Mans FC players
Ligue 2 players
Championnat National players